The Barr Building is an historic structure located in the Golden Triangle section of Downtown Washington, D.C.  It was listed on the District of Columbia Inventory of Historic Sites in 2012 and on the National Register of Historic Places in 2013. The building was designed by Washington architect B. Stanley Simmons in the Gothic Revival style and named for its developer, John L. Barr. When completed in 1927, the building was noted for having the fastest elevators in the city.

References

Office buildings completed in 1927
Office buildings on the National Register of Historic Places in Washington, D.C.
Office buildings in Washington, D.C.
Gothic Revival architecture in Washington, D.C.